Christian Obumeneme Madu (born 9 July 1993 in Enugu, Nigeria) is a Nigerian professional footballer. He plays as attacking midfielder for Enugu Rangers. He was formerly a midfielder playing for Enugu Rangers.

Early life and career 
Christian was born in Udi Local Government Area of Enugu State on 9 July 1993. He grew up in Oji River temporarily where he lived with his parents before relocating to Abuja. While he was in Oji River he attended Federal Co-operative College and graduated with an OND in 2012. Christian began his football career during his childhood days, after finishing from college in 2012 he started playing football full-time. In 2014, he signed a four-year contract with Enugu Rangers and started playing professional football and won Enugu Ranger player of the month in the 2015-16 season. In 2017, while still playing for the Enugu Rangers Christian was absent from matches and trainings for several weeks without official notification to the team and following his absence the management of Enugu Rangers issued a statement that Christian had gone "AWOL". During that period they were rumors he had signed another team.

In August 2018, Christian's contract with Enugu Rangers expired and he signed a new contract with Portuguese team CD Nacional. His new contract with CD Nacional is a four-year deal. Madu left the club by mutual consent on 10 January 2019.

References

External links
Christian Madu at Footballdatabase

Living people
1993 births
People from Enugu State
Nigerian footballers
Rangers International F.C. players
C.D. Nacional players
Expatriate footballers in Portugal
Association football midfielders